Edward Richard Morrison Bye (born 12 June 1955) is a British film and TV producer and director. He directed the episodes of the science-fiction sitcom Red Dwarf from Series I-IV and VII-VIII.

Early life 
Ed Bye is the son of Royal Marine Colonel Francis Clifford Edward Bye, OBE, of Great Bedwyn, Wiltshire, and of Twickenham, Ed Bye attended Mount House School in the late 1960s, where he was known as a swimmer. He later attended Ravensbourne College, London.

Career 
In 2011, he co-founded the production company Tall TV with Tim Dawson and Susan Nickson.

Personal life 

He is married to comedian and actress Ruby Wax and has three children. His sister, Julia (d. 2009), was married to the 6th Lord Garvagh.

Filmography

Director
Dial M for Middlesbrough (2019) – TV special
Death on the Tyne (2018) – TV special
Vicious (2013–2015) – 2 series
 Not Going Out (2013) – 2013 Christmas special
 Coming of Age (2011) – Series 3 (8 episodes)
 Round Ireland with a Fridge (2010) – feature film
 My Family (2009–2011) – 2009 Christmas special and Series 10
 After You've Gone (2007 Christmas special) – TV episode
 The Vicar of Dibley (2007 series finale)
 Home Again (2006) – TV series
 Foley & McColl: This Way Up (2005) – TV pilot episode
 Absolutely Fabulous (2004; episode 9) – TV episode
 Fat Slags (2004) – feature film
 Celeb (2002) – TV series
 French & Saunders: Celebrity Christmas Puddings (2002) – TV special
 French & Saunders: The Egg (2002) – TV special
 Lenny Henry in Pieces (2001 special; 2002) – TV special and series
 French & Saunders Live (2000) – video
 Kevin & Perry Go Large (2000) – feature film
 Can't Cook, Won't Cook (1998) – TV special
 Red Dwarf: A-Z (1998) – TV special
 Bottom Live 3: Hooligan's Island (1997) – video
 Ruby (1997–2000) – TV series
 Eddie Izzard: Definite Article (1996) – video
 Jack and Jeremy's Police 4 (1995) – TV comedy
 Red Dwarf: Smeg Outs (1995) – video
 Carrott U Like (1994) – TV comedy
 The Detectives (1993–1997) – TV series
 Mama's Back! (1993) – TV comedy
 The 10%ers (1993) – TV series
 Bottom (1991–1992) – TV series
 The Full Wax (1991–1993) – TV series
 Canned Carrott (1990–1992) – TV series
 Red Dwarf (1988–1991 series I-IV; 1997–1999 series VII-VIII) – TV series
 Craig Goes Mad in Melbourne (1988) – TV series
 Filthy Rich & Catflap (1987) – TV series
 Girls on Top (1985–1986) – TV series

Producer
 Celeb (2002) – TV series
 Can't Cook, Won't Cook (1998) – TV special
 Red Dwarf: A-Z (1998) – TV special
 Red Dwarf (1997–1999 series VII-VIII) – TV series
 How To Be A Little Sod (1995) – TV series (Executive Producer)
 Red Dwarf: Smeg Outs (1995) – video
 Carrott U Like (1994) – TV comedy
 The Detectives (1993–1997) – TV series
 The 10%ers (1993) – TV series
 Bottom (1991–1992) – TV series
 The Full Wax (1991–1993) – TV series
 Canned Carrott (1990–1992) – TV series
 Craig Goes Mad in Melbourne (1988) – TV series
 Spider Plant Man. Comic relief special with Tony Robinson, Jim Broadbent and Rowan Atkinson. SPFX by the Farm, Andy Hay and Steve Deakin-Davies.

Miscellaneous
 Lenny Henry in Pieces (2001 special; 2002) – TV special and series (Writer)
 Jack and Jeremy's Real Lives (1996) – TV series (Script Supervisor)
 The Young Ones (1982–1984) – TV series (Production Manager)

References

External links

Robert Llewellyn Video Interview with Ed Bye at LLEWTUBE

1955 births
Living people
British television directors
British television producers
People from Hammersmith
People educated at Mount House School, Tavistock